Gøtueiði a town in the Faroe Islands, located deep in the Skalafjordur-inlet on Eysturoy, founded in 1850. 

The village has now grown towards its neighbour-village Skipanes. During the 1980s there were religious tent-meetings in Gøtueiði.

Gotueidi consists of the villages/settlements Norðragøta (Northern Gøta), Syðrugøta (Southern Gøta), Gøtugjógv (Gøta's cleft) and Gøtueiði (Gøta's isthmus). They form part of the Eystur municipality.

See also
 List of towns in the Faroe Islands

External links
Faroeislands.dk: Gotueidi Images and description of all cities on the Faroe Islands.

Populated places in the Faroe Islands
Populated places established in 1850